Nelson Pessoa Filho (born December 16, 1935) is a Brazilian equestrian who competed in the sport of Show jumping. He was among the first Brazilian civilians to do well in the sport, as the military had dominated it in the Brazil of that era.

Career highlights 
He competed in the 1956 Summer Olympics and came fifth in Equestrian at the 1964 Summer Olympics - Individual jumping. He moved to Europe in 1961. He won the 1966 European Show Jumping Championships and won twice at Hickstead. He came second in the 1984 Show Jumping World Cup, and in 1991 he was again second, riding Special Envoy. In 1992 Summer Olympics in Barcelona at 56 he was the oldest equestrian, while his 19-year-old son was the youngest.

He owns a famous equestrian school at Haras du Ligny in Fleurus, Belgium. His students include Alvaro de Miranda Neto and Athina Onassis Miranda. His son is the Olympic gold medallist Rodrigo Pessoa.

His nickname is Neco.

He is the founder of Pessoa Brands; the Pessoa lines include their famous saddles, bridles, girths, blankets and tack.

References

External links 
 Rodrigo Pessoa (official)

1935 births
Living people
Brazilian male equestrians
Brazilian show jumping riders
Olympic equestrians of Brazil
Equestrians at the 1956 Summer Olympics
Equestrians at the 1964 Summer Olympics
Equestrians at the 1968 Summer Olympics
Equestrians at the 1972 Summer Olympics
Equestrians at the 1992 Summer Olympics
Pan American Games medalists in equestrian
Pan American Games gold medalists for Brazil
Pan American Games silver medalists for Brazil
Equestrians at the 1959 Pan American Games
Equestrians at the 1967 Pan American Games
Medalists at the 1959 Pan American Games
Medalists at the 1967 Pan American Games